The Cercle de Lorraine or Club van Lotharingen is a Belgian business club, located in Brussels, Belgium. The club was founded in 1998, and it wants to bring together, distinguished and representative personalities from the Belgian financial community, French speaking (Wallonia, south part of Belgium) as well as Dutch speaking (Flanders, north part of Belgium), who are united within an honorary committee.

Notable members
 Albert Karaziwan, Syrian-Belgian businessman
 Baron Georges Jacobs, Union Chimique Belge
 Luc Bertrand, Ackermans & Van Haaren
 Frank Beuselinck, DHL BeLux
 Karel Boone, Lotus Bakeries
 Baron Daniel Cardon de Lichtbuer
 Baron Dominique Collinet, Carmeuse
 Viscount Étienne Davignon, Société Générale de Belgique
 Baron Paul De Keersmaeker, Interbrew
 Count Jean-Pierre de Launoit, Axa-Royale Belge
 Jean-Marie Delwart, Floridienne
 Baron Paul de Meester, Besix
 Rik De Nolf, Roularta Media Group and VTM
 Chevalier Claude Desseille, Winterthur group
 Count Diego du Monceau de Bergendal, GIB Group
 Baron Donald Marc Fallon, Cimenteries CBR
 Baron Albert Frère, Bruxelles Lambert group
 Jean Gandois, Suez
 Count Maurice Lippens, Fortis
 Gérard Mestrallet, Suez Lyonnaise des Eaux
 Baron Baudouin Michiels, Kraft Foods
 Baroness Solange Schwennicke, Delvaux-Dujardin group
 Michel Tilmant, ING Group
 Christian Van Thillo, De Persgroep
 Roland Vaxelaire, Carrefour Belgium
 Baron Maurice Velge, Velge International
 Luc Willame, Glaverbel
 Philippe Wilmès, Société Fédérale d'Investissement
 Count Dr. Ignace De Baere, De Eik NV

See also

 Cercle Gaulois
 De Warande
 Federation of Belgian Enterprises
 Olivaint Conference of Belgium
 Union Wallonne des Entreprises
 University Foundation
 VOKA

Sources
 

Gentlemen's clubs in Belgium
Economy of Belgium
Trade associations based in Belgium
1998 establishments in Belgium
Organisations based in Brussels